Salih Mirzabeyoğlu (real name Salih İzzet Erdiş; 10 May 1950, in Erzincan – 16 May 2018, in Yalova) was a Kurdish-Turkish Islamic fundamentalist with Sayyid origin. His family were close to both the Naqshbandi and Nurcu Islamic brotherhoods, and were involved with the Kurdish Sheikh Said rebellion in 1925 against the newly founded Turkish Republic. Like most İBDA-C members, he was an ethnic Kurd.

In 1975, he and his friends published a political magazine called Gölge (Shadow). Mirzabeyoğlu was influenced by the Islamist poet Necip Fazıl Kısakürek who published a magazine called Büyük Doğu.

He is the ideologue and alleged leader of the Great Eastern Islamic Raiders' Front (İBDA-C), a militant Islamist group present in Turkey. He was arrested on 29 December 1998 for allegedly trying to overthrow the constitutional order by force. Subsequently, following the İBDA-C concept of 'leaderless resistance', further attacks on banks, synagogues, churches, places serving alcohol and TV stations were claimed by groups who said they were part of İBDA-C. The bombings in Istanbul claimed 65 lives including that of the British consul general Roger Short. Mirzabeyoğlu was sentenced to life imprisonment.

On 23 July 2014, he was released from prison, and on 29 November 2014 consulted with President Recep Tayyip Erdoğan.

Bibliography 

He has written 50 books. 
 Bütün Fikrin Gerekliliği (Necessity of Whole Idea)
 Tarihten Bir Yaprak (A Paper from History)
 Necip Fazıl'la Baş Başa (with Necip Fazıl)
 Kültür Davamız (Our Culture Thesis)
 Şiir ve Sanat Hikemiyatı (Poetry and Art Philosophy)
 İstikbal İslâmındır (The Future Belongs to Islam)
 Anafor (Whirlpool - poems)
 Adımlar (Steps - interviews)
 Büyük Muztaribler 1-2-3 (Great Agitateds - philosophy history)
 Tilki Günlüğü 1-2-3-4-5-6 (Fox Diary - spiritual novel)
 Sefine (Ship - philosophy of physics)
 Elif (Aleph - painting)
 Yağmurcu (Rainer)
 Hırka-ı Tecrid
 Marifetname
 Yaşamayı Deneme (Trying to Live - novel)
 Hakikat-i Ferdiye
 Furkan (different kind of dictionary)
 Telegram
 Müjdelerin Müjdesi (stories)
 Münşeat (a different kind of poems)
 İBDA Diyalektiği (Dialect of İBDA)
 İslam'a Muhatap Anlayış (Understanding Towards to Islam)
 Kavgam 1-2 (My Struggle)
 Sahabinin Rolü ve Manası (Role and Meaning of Disciple)
 Hukuk Edebiyatı (Literature of the Laws)
 Başyücelik Devleti (State of Başyücelik)
 Aydınlık Savaşçıları (Fighters of Light - epic)
 Dil ve Anlayış (Language and Understanding)
 Kökler (Roots)
 Kayan Yıldız Sırrı (Mystery of Slipping Star - poem)
 İktisat ve Ahlâk (Economics and Morality)
 Parakuta (about politics/aesthetics of money)
 Önsöz (Preface)
 İdeolocya ve İhtilâl (Ideology and Revolution)
 Hikemiyat (Philosophies)
 İşkence (Torture - anecdote)
 Gölgeler (Shadows - novel)
 Damlaya Damlaya
 Üç Işık (Three Lights)
 Erkam (Philosophy of mathematics)
 Berzah

See also 
Abdulhakim Arvasi

References 

1950 births
2018 deaths
Islamic fundamentalism
Turkish Islamists
20th-century Turkish male writers
21st-century Turkish male writers
People from Erzincan
Turkish Kurdish people
Leaders of Islamic terror groups
Turkish prisoners and detainees